Dagmar Johanne Amalie Overbye (23 April 1887 – 6 May 1929) was a Danish serial killer. She murdered between 9 and 25 children, including one of her own, during a seven-year period from 1913 to 1920. On 3 March 1921 she was sentenced to death in one of the most noted trials in Danish history—one that changed legislation on childcare.
The sentence was later commuted to life in prison.

Overbye was working as a professional child caretaker, caring for babies born outside of marriage, murdering her own charges. She strangled them, drowned them or burned them to death in her masonry heater. The corpses were either cremated, buried or hidden in the loft.

Overbye was convicted of nine murders, as there were insufficient proof of the others. Her lawyer based the case on Overbye being abused herself as a baby, but that did not impress the judge. She became one of the three women sentenced to death in Denmark in the 20th century, but she – like the other two – was reprieved.

She died in prison on 6 May 1929, at age 42. Notes relating to her case are included in the Politihistorisk Museum (Museum of Police History) in Nørrebro, Copenhagen.

The Danish author Karen Søndergaard Koldste wrote a novel called Englemagersken (The Angel Maker) based on her. Teatret ved Sorte Hest in Copenhagen has performed a play named Historien om en Mo(r)der (Morder meaning "murderer" and moder meaning "mother") based on her life.

See also 
List of serial killers by country
List of serial killers by number of victims

References 

1887 births
1929 deaths
20th-century Danish criminals
Danish female serial killers
Danish murderers of children
Danish people convicted of murder
Danish people who died in prison custody
Danish prisoners sentenced to death
Filicides
People convicted of murder by Denmark
Prisoners sentenced to death by Denmark
Prisoners who died in Danish detention
Serial killers who died in prison custody
Women sentenced to death